STS-61-M was a proposed NASA Space Shuttle program mission, planned for July 1986 but canceled following the Space Shuttle Challenger disaster (STS-51-L).

Payload was to have been TDRS-D of the U.S. tracking and data relay satellite (TDRS) satellites.

Primary Crew

Backup Crew

See also 

 Canceled Space Shuttle missions
 STS-144
 STS-61-H

References 

Cancelled Space Shuttle missions
Space Shuttle Challenger disaster